The Sankenbachsee is a tarn southwest of  Baiersbronn in the Black Forest in southwestern Germany. The Sankenbach stream flows through the lake. In the 1980s a low weir was built at the outflow of the Sankenbach which protects the lake from silting up.

Freudenstadt (district)
Cirques of Europe
Lakes of Baden-Württemberg
Tarns of the Black Forest
LSankenbachsee